O Mapa da Mina is a Brazilian telenovela produced and aired by TV Globo from March 29, 1993 to September 3, 1993, in 137 episodes.

Written by Cassiano Gabus Mendes, with the collaboration of Maria Adelaide Amaral, Gugu Keller, Walkíria Portero and Dejair Cardoso, the telenovela was directed by Roberto Naar and Flávio Colatrello Jr.

Carla Marins, Cássio Gabus Mendes, Luís Gustavo, Mauro Mendonça, Malu Mader, Tato Gabus Mendes and Pedro Paulo Rangel star in the main roles.

Plot 
In Uruguay, a gang steals ten million dollars in diamonds. One of the thieves, Rodolfo (Mauro Mendonça), flees to Argentina. Ivo (Paulo José) goes to São Paulo, hiding the product of the robbery, except that he is arrested. Eight years later, when he gets out of jail, he is run over and dies, but before this he still has time to tell his son, Rodrigo (Cássio Gabus Mendes), that he and Ivo had a map tattooed above a girl's buttocks, Elisa (Carla Marins), a map that shows a location of the diamonds, even taking care to photograph the girl. Elisa is a novice and is about to make her perpetual vows.

Cast 
 Carla Marins as Elisa Souto
 Cássio Gabus Mendes as Rodrigo Simeone
 Malu Mader as Wanda Machado
 Luís Gustavo as Antônio "Toni" Machado
 Mauro Mendonça as Rodolfo Torres de Almeida
 Eva Wilma as Tatiana Torres de Almeida
 Fernanda Montenegro as Madalena Moraes
 Maurício Mattar as Bakur Shariff
 Tato Gabus Mendes as Raul Gouveia
 Carolina Ferraz as Bruna Torres de Almeida Lovatelli
 Beth Goulart as Tânia Moraes 
 Nair Bello as Zilda Machado
 Pedro Paulo Rangel as Joaquim "Joe" Machado
 Gianfrancesco Guarnieri as Vicente Rocha
 Bete Mendes as Carmem Simeone Rocha
 Dennis Carvalho as Erasmo Alcântara
 Maria Padilha as Giovana Alcântara
 Nelson Freitas as Roberto Lovatelli
 Ana Rosa as Antônia Moraes
 Antônio Abujamra as Nero Horácio Koll
 Mila Moreira as Carlota Strega
 Paula Burlamaqui as Neide Gonzaga
 John Herbert as Wagner Amaral
 Suzana Faini as Amélia Borges "Madre Amélia"
 Antônio Grassi as César de Oliveira
 Luíza Brunet as Nadir da Silva
 Gisela Marques as Lygia Amaral
 Marcelo Serrado as Sílvio Azevedo
 Bianca Byington as Laís Azevedo
 Andrea Murucci as Paula Strega
 Cláudio Curi as Pasqualino Stromboli
 Ada Chaseliov as Olga Lopes
 Mariane Vicentini as Cibele Prado
 Luis Maçãs as Bruno Alencar "Bubi"
 Clarice Niskier as Dayse Correia
 Paulo Carvalho as Celso Torres
 Desireé Vignolli as Bárbara Lourenço
 Mara Carvalho as Ângela Almeida
 Jonathan Nogueira as Pedro Alcântara
 Natália Lage as Beatriz "Bia" Amaral
 Tatyane Goulart as Carolina "Carol" Torres de Almeida Lovatelli
 Amanda Acosta as Eva Alcântara
 Murilo Figueiredo as André Amaral
 Luã Ubacker as Leonardo "Léo" Azevedo

Guest stars 
 Paulo José as Ivo Simeone
 Marco Nanini as Breno Ferraz
 Joana Rocha as Carolina Aguiar
 Françoise Forton as Fernanda Sabino
 Lima Duarte as Mauro Camargo
 Stênio Garcia as Pedro Cunha
 Tony Ramos as Jorge Flores
 Airton Aranha as Allan Telles
 Xuxa Lopes as Priscilane Souto
 Catalina Bonaki as Gracyanne Ariola
 Yaçanã Martins as Felipa Maria de Freitas
 Guilherme Karan as Caíque Martelo "Dr. Martelo"
 Yara Vitória as Maura de Carvalho 
 Leina Krespi as Zuleica Camargo
 Lícia Magna as Jurema Sousa "Vizinha de Zilda"
 João Signorelli as Carlos "Carlito" Fernando
 Marcelo Escorel as Paulo Ricardo de Freitas
 Malu Valle as Beatriz Pereira 
 Miwa Yanagizawa as Rafaela Torres
 Silvia Pareja as Berenice Fragoso
 Sacy as Tônico Lemos
 Waldir Rodrigues as Flávio Garcia
 Paulo Rezende as Edmundo Leitão
 Eduarda Valente as Mariana de Jesus

References

External links

 O mapa da Mina (In Memória Globo)

1993 Brazilian television series debuts
1993 Brazilian television series endings
1993 telenovelas
TV Globo telenovelas